The Citizenship (Armed Forces) Act 2014 is an Act of the Parliament of the United Kingdom that received Royal Assent on 13 March 2014 after being introduced on 19 June 2013. The bill amended the British Nationality Act 1981 in such a way as to not disadvantage foreign and Commonwealth members of the British Armed Forces when applying for naturalisation as British citizens.

References

United Kingdom Acts of Parliament 2014